Pā'ea is a commune in the suburbs of Pape'ete in French Polynesia, an overseas territory of France in the southern Pacific Ocean. Pā'ea is located on the island of Tahiti, in the administrative subdivision of the Windward Islands, themselves part of the Society Islands. At the 2017 census it had a population of 13,021.

Tahiti's west coast freeway runs through Pā'ea and ends in Teahupo'o down south. Going northbound would take drivers toward Pape'ete.

The area of Pā'ea was first settled by Polynesian explorers. Captain James Cook had arrived in 1769. Pā'ea was part of the Kingdom of Tahiti until France claimed the islands of French Polynesia. The Faaa International Airport was built in 1962 and opened later on. The now defunct Air Moorea's flight 1121 crashed while it was flying to Mo'orea. Close to where the crash site is located lies a rock with the names of those people killed in the accident.

Mo'orea is north of Pā'ea and is seen as a gray mound sticking out of the Pacific Ocean. Mount Orohena is a major mountain nearby measuring 7,330 feet tall.

Geography

Climate
Paea has a tropical rainforest climate (Köppen climate classification Af).

Population

See also
Faaa

References

Communes of French Polynesia